Ailleurs land is a 2003 album recorded by French singer Florent Pagny. It was his tenth album oversall and was released on April 8, 2003. It achieved huge success in France and Belgium (Wallonia), where it remained charted respectively for 75 and 34 weeks, including several weeks atop. The album was also successful in Switzerland. It was led by the single "Ma Liberté de penser", a number-one hit in both countries, and followed by "Je trace", which had a minor success (#26 in France, #34 in Belgium, #65 in Switzerland). French singers Calogero, Pascal Obispo, Alain Lanty, Canadian singer Daniel Lavoie and actress Sandrine Kiberlain participated in the writing or the composing of the album.

Track listing
 "Je trace" (Lionel Florence, Maurici, Calogero) — 3:23
 "Ailleurs land" (Jean-Pierre Lebert, Pascal Obispo) — 3:54
 "Ma Liberté de penser" (Florence, Obispo, Pagny) — 3:24
 "Je parle même pas d'amour" (Pierre Grillet, Alain Lanty) — 4:26
 "La folie d'un ange" (Daran, Filippi) — 3:12
 "Le feu à la peau" (Bruce Homs, Daniel Lavoie) — 4:27
 "Sauf toi" (Frédéric Brun, Nicolas Richard) — 3:10
 "Demandez à mon cheval" (Asdorve, Lebert, Obispo) — 4:07
 "Mon amour oublie que je l'aime" (Jérôme Attal, Daran) — 4:15
 "Guérir" (Daran, Florence) — 4:49
 "Sur mesure" (Daran, Sandrine Kiberlain) — 4:53

Source : Allmusic.

Personnel 

Denis Bennarosh – drums
Jean Francois Berger – programming, clavier, realization
Emerik Castaing – assistant
Bertrand Chatnet – engineer, vocal engineer
Daran – synthesizer, acoustic guitar, arranger, electric guitar, classical guitar, realization
Nick Davis – mixing
Francois Delabriere – programming, engineer, realization
Chistopher Deschamps – drums
Florian Dubos – guitar
Steve Forward – engineer
Erik Fostinelli – synthesizer, guitar, percussion, piano, arranger, electric guitar, programming, realization, Bass
Benoit Fourreau – tuba
Jean-Paul Gonnod – engineer
Emmanuel Goulet – programming
Marc Guéroult – assistant
Simon Hale – piano, arranger, string arrangements, executive director
Pierre Jaconelli – electric guitar
Sylvain Joasson – drums
Bertrand Lamblot – musical direction
Sandrine Le Bars – production executive
Jean Marion – photography, photoshop artist
Jean-Loup Morette – engineer
Juan José Mosalini – bandoneon
Pascal Obispo – acoustic guitar, programming, chorus, realization
Florent Pagny – chorus
Benjamin Raffaelli – guitar, realization
Stanislas Renoult – arranger, string arrangements
David Salkin – drums
Miles Showell – mastering
Greg Slapzinsky – harmonica
Ian Thomas – drums
Laurent Vernerey – bass
Christophe Voisin – programming
Volodia – engineer

Charts

Certifications and sales

Releases

References

2003 albums
Florent Pagny albums